Paraoncidium keiense is a species of air-breathing sea slug, a shell-less marine pulmonate gastropod mollusk in the family Onchidiidae.

References

External links

Onchidiidae
Gastropods described in 1926